Lake Villa is a village in Lake County, Illinois United States. Per the 2020 census, the population was 8,741. Lake Villa lies within Lake Villa Township and about 50 miles north of Chicago and is part of the United States Census Bureau's Chicago combined statistical area (CSA).

Geography
Lake Villa is located at  (42.417546, -88.082360).

The village lies in a gently rolling moraine landscape, dominated by lakes of glacial origin known as the Chain O'Lakes. Among these are Cedar Lake, north of the village center, and Deep Lake, to the east. There are several smaller lakes and ponds, along with a complement of wetlands. The lakes and ponds have been important in Lake Villa's historic tourist industry, and over the years led to a small ice industry.

Drainage is ultimate to the Des Plaines and Fox rivers, both of which flow to the Illinois River and ultimately the Mississippi.

The Wisconsin Central Railway runs through the village center. This is a heavily used freight line which also carries Metra commuter rail traffic from Antioch, Illinois to the Chicago Loop.

Demographics

2020 census

2000 Census
As of the census of 2000, there were 5,864 people, 2,052 households, and 1,594 families residing in the village. The racial makeup of the village was 92.94% White, 2.47% African American, 0.12% Native American, 1.64% Asian, 0.09% Pacific Islander, 0.89% from other races, and 1.86% from two or more races. Hispanic or Latino of any race were 3.09% of the population.

There were 2,052 households, out of which 45.1% had children under the age of 18 living with them, 67.9% were married couples living together, 7.5% had a female householder with no husband present, and 22.3% were non-families. 17.1% of all households were made up of individuals, and 6.2% had someone living alone who was 65 years of age or older. The average household size was 2.81 and the average family size was 3.20.

In the village, the population was spread out, with 32.1% under the age of 18, 5.8% from 18 to 24, 37.8% from 25 to 44, 18.9% from 45 to 64, and 5.5% who were 65 years of age or older. The median age was 33 years. For every 100 females, there were 99.4 males. For every 100 females age 18 and over, there were 94.5 males.

The median income for a household in the village was $65,078, and the median income for a family was $75,078. Males had a median income of $51,806 versus $36,961 for females. The per capita income for the village was $26,238. About 1.9% of families and 3.7% of the population were below the poverty line, including 4.7% of those under age 18 and 7.3% of those ages 65 or over.

Lake Villa has a significant Polish community, and the community has become considerably more diverse in recent years.

Government

Elected officials
Mayor
James McDonald

Clerk
Mary Konrad

Trustees
Scott Bartlett
Tom O'Reilly
Karen Harms
Kevin Kruckeberg
Allena Barbato
Jeff Nielsen

Education
School districts that serve Lake Villa include:
 Elementary school districts
 Lake Villa Community Consolidated School District 41
 Antioch Community Consolidated School District 34
 High school districts
 Antioch Community High School District 117
 Grant Community High School District 124
 Grayslake Community High School District 127

High school 
Lake Villa School Students will attend one of the following based on geographic location:
Lakes Community High School in Lake Villa (grades 9-12)
Grant Community High School in Fox Lake (grades 9-12)
Grayslake North High School in Grayslake (grades 9-12)
Antioch Community High School in Antioch (grades 9-12)
Warren Township High School in Gurnee (grades 9-12)

Middle school(s) 
Peter J. Palombi Middle School in Lake Villa (Grades 6-8)
Antioch Upper Grade School in Antioch (Grades 6-8)
Millburn Middle School in Lindenhurst (Grades 6-8)
Woodland Middle School in Gurnee (Grades 6-8)
Frederick School in Grayslake (Grades 5-6)
Grayslake Middle School in Grayslake (Grades 7-8)
Gavin South Jr. High School (Grades 5-8) in Ingleside

Elementary school(s) 
Olive C. Martin Elementary in Lake Villa (Grades PK-5)
William L. Thompson Elementary in Lake Villa (Grades PK-5)
B. J. Hooper Elementary in Lindenhurst (Grades K-5)
Oakland Elementary School in Lake Villa (Grades K-5)
Emmons Grade School in Antioch (Grades K-8)
Grass Lake Elementary School in Antioch (Grades PK-8)
Millburn Central School in Old Mill Creek (Grades PK-5)
Woodland Primary School in Grayslake (Grades PK-K)
Woodland Elementary School in Grayslake (Grades 1-3)
Woodland Intermediate School in Gurnee (Grades 4-5)
Avon Center Elementary School (Grades K-4) in Round Lake Beach
Gavin Central School (Grades PK-4) in Ingleside

Library 
Lake Villa District Library

Infrastructure

Transportation 
Lake Villa has a station on Metra's North Central Service, which provides daily rail service between Antioch and Chicago's Union Station.

Major streets
  Milwaukee Avenue
  Grand Avenue
 Grass lake Road
 Petite Lake Road
 Deep Lake Road
 Fairfield Road
 Cedar Lake Road
 Monaville Road
  Old Grand Avenue

References

Further reading
Brysiewicz, Joseph W.  Chicago's metropolitan fringe: Lake Villa, Illinois: the construction of multiple historical narratives. Lake Forest, Illinois: Lake Forest College, 2001.
Brysiewicz, Joseph W.  Lake Villa Township, Illinois. Chicago: Arcadia Publications, 2001.
Article by Douglas Knox in Encyclopedia of Chicago History
Encyclopedia of Chicago. Edited by James R. Grossman, Ann Durkin Keating & Janice L. Reiff. Chicago: University of Chicago Press, 2004
Lake Villa then and now: a centennial history of Lake Villa, Illinois, 1901 - 2001. Compiled and edited by Candace M. Saunders and Julianne Kloc Trychta. Lake Villa, Illinois: Village of Lake Villa, Illinois, 2001.

External links
 Village of Lake Villa

Villages in Illinois
Villages in Lake County, Illinois
Populated places established in 1901
1901 establishments in Illinois